The 2013–14 First League of the Federation of Bosnia and Herzegovina was the nineteenth edition of this competition and fourteenth edition as the second tier league in Bosnia and Herzegovina.

NK Vitez won 2012-13 season and gained promotion to Premier League of Bosnia and Herzegovina.

Teams in 2013-14 season
A total of 16 teams will take part in this season. League winner wins promotion to Premier League with 3-5 teams will get relegated at the end of the season.

Changes from 2012-13 season

Teams left the league
NK Vitez - promoted to the Premier League
Krajišnik - relegated to the League of Una-Sana Canton1
Bosna - relegated to the Second League Center
Goražde - relegated to the Second League Center
Krajina - relegated to the Second League West
Troglav - relegated to the Second League South - stayed in the league as Second League West champion decided not to take part in First League
1Krajišnik has left the 2012-13 competition after 15 rounds; FA decided to relegate them to lowest league possible so they were relegated to their respective canton league which stands for 4th level; they will start next competitive season with 6 points deduction

Teams entered the league
GOŠK - relegated from the Premier League
Gradina - relegated from the Premier League
Igman Konjic - promoted from the Second League South
Mladost Doboj Kakanj - promoted from the Second League Center
Orašje - promoted from the Second League North
Una - promoted from the Second League West - decided not to take part in First League, Troglav stayed in the First League

Stadiums and locations

League table

Results

Statistics

List of goalscorers

External links
Official site for the Football Federation of the Federation of Bosnia and Herzegovina

2
Bos
First League of the Federation of Bosnia and Herzegovina seasons